Minni may be:
an ethnonym attested in the Hebrew Bible, possibly the Mannaeans
the Old Norse for "remembrance", see minnisveig

See also
 Mini (disambiguation)
 Minié (disambiguation)
 Minnie (disambiguation)